Cosmic Coaster is a junior roller coaster at Worlds of Fun. The ride is Snoopy-themed and is located within the park's Planet Snoopy section.

Cosmic Coaster at Worlds of Fun first opened in the Americana section of the park in 1993 as Wacky Worm and was manufactured by Preston & Barbieri. This area became Camp Snoopy in 2001 and later remodeled into Planet Snoopy in 2011. In 2012, Wacky Worm was moved within Planet Snoopy and received a new name and theme as Cosmic Coaster as part of an investment in overall general park improvements that year. It is located in the space previously occupied by the Woodstock Express kiddie train.

See also
 2012 in amusement parks

References

External links 
Cosmic Coaster at Worlds of Fun's website
Cosmic Coaster at Around The World

Junior roller coasters
Roller coasters operated by Cedar Fair
Roller coasters in Missouri
Roller coasters introduced in 1993
Worlds of Fun
Peanuts in amusement parks